The Surrey Research Park is a large research park in Guildford, Surrey. The Surrey Research Park has been planned, developed, funded and managed by the University of Surrey which operates the park as a wholly owned University Enterprise Unit.

Objectives  
The Park was first established in 1981 to meet five objectives which remain as guiding principles for the site.  These support the three stakeholders in the site. The objectives for the University include: to develop some independent income for the University of Surrey, raising the profile of the University of Surrey as a centre for scholarship and innovation and supporting technology and knowledge transfer to tenants.  The objective set by the Park for tenant companies is to give them a competitive advantage through sharing the risks of starting a company and gaining access to technology, talent and property tenure arrangements that give the businesses flexibility to match their needs as they grow.  For the local government, whose involvement was to grant permission for the site on University land, is to support regional economic development.

To meet these objectives the Park pioneered business incubation in the Surrey Technology Centre, the first building to be opened on the site in 1984, offers 7,400 sq m of space to start ups and today continues to offer this service with the additional activities of Surrey SETsquared that occupies 240 sq m. SETsquared is a partnership between the Universities of Bristol, Bath, Exeter, Southampton and Surrey. It is a not-for-profit Government subsidised organisation providing bespoke business support for high-tech and/or high potential start-up ventures.

Today the Surrey Technology Centre is one of 31 buildings on the site, which collectively provide some 70,000 sq m of space to science, engineering, technology and social science based businesses.  These companies include those involved in the computer games, space centered commercial enterprises, bio-medicine, cybersecurity, electronics, chemical engineering, and veterinary medicine as examples. The park operates with around 175 companies on site at any one time, employing some 4,500 staff. It is responsible for some £500m of economic activity each year and is a major financial asset for the University as well as creating a culture of innovation in the region.

Businesses
The Park hosts over 140 companies and organisations with offices on the Research Park including:

22cans
Angle Europe Ltd
Arcadis Consulting (UK) Ltd
BAE Systems Applied Intelligence Ltd
Basemap Ltd
BOC Linde
Earth-i Ltd
Eseye Ltd
Fitzpatricks Referrals
Future Biogas Ltd
Gold I Ltd
Hygiena International Ltd
ID Business Solutions Ltd
Luggage Logistics
Prime Vigilance
Medpharm Ltd
Morpace International
MTS Systems Ltd
Seven League Software Ltd
Surrey Satellite Technology Limited
SATRO
Technology Resourcing Ltd
Thomson Ecology
The Whiteley Clinic

Geography

History
The idea was first promoted in 1979 and it was included in Surrey County Council's development plan in 1981. The Research Park was opened by the Duke of Kent and the first tenants arrived in 1985.

By 1989 the Research Park hosted sixty-five companies in business. By March 2015, 90% of the Park had been developed with just two remaining sites, known as George Stephenson Place and Faraday Court, undeveloped. There are currently 140 companies and organisations on the Park.

References

External links
Surrey Research Park Website

University of Surrey
Science parks in the United Kingdom